is a Japanese professional golfer.

Tanaka was born in Hiroshima Prefecture. He turned professional in 1991, joined the Japan Golf Tour in 1995 and played mainly on that tour until 2001. He won 10 times on tour.

Tanaka earned a PGA Tour card for 2002 at the 2001 Qualifying School, and held his card through 2006 by finishing in the top 125 on the money list each year. In 2006, he lost his card by finishing 224th on the money list. His best finishes on the PGA Tour are two T-3, at the 2004 B.C. Open and the 2005 Chrysler Championship.

Professional wins (15)

Japan Golf Tour wins (10)

Japan Golf Tour playoff record (0–1)

Japan Challenge Tour wins (2)
1995 Mito Green Open, Korakuen Cup (2nd)

Other wins (3)
1996 Hirao Masaaki Pro-Am (Japan)
1998 Hirao Masaaki Pro-Am (Japan)
2001 Hawaii Pearl Open

Results in major championships

Note: Tanaka never played in the Masters Tournament

CUT = missed the half-way cut
"T" = tied

Results in The Players Championship

CUT = missed the halfway cut
WD = withdrew
"T" indicates a tie for a place

Results in World Golf Championships

1Cancelled due to 9/11

QF, R16, R32, R64 = Round in which player lost in match play
"T" = Tied
NT = No tournament

Team appearances
World Cup (representing Japan): 2000, 2003, 2004

See also
2001 PGA Tour Qualifying School graduates
List of golfers with most Japan Golf Tour wins

References

External links

Japanese male golfers
Japan Golf Tour golfers
PGA Tour golfers
Sportspeople from Hiroshima Prefecture
1971 births
Living people